Leslie Rogers Darr (November 8, 1886 – May 29, 1967) was a United States district judge of the United States District Court for the Eastern District of Tennessee and the United States District Court for the Middle District of Tennessee.

Education and career

Born in Jasper, Tennessee, Darr received a Bachelor of Laws from the Cumberland School of Law (then part of Cumberland University, now part of Samford University) in 1909. He was in private practice in Jasper from 1910 to 1926. He was a judge of the 18th Circuit Court of Tennessee from 1926 to 1939.

Federal judicial service

Darr was nominated by President Franklin D. Roosevelt on May 24, 1939, to the United States District Court for the Eastern District of Tennessee and the United States District Court for the Middle District of Tennessee, to a new joint seat authorized by 52 Stat. 584. He was confirmed by the United States Senate on May 31, 1939, and received his commission on June 2, 1939. He was reassigned by operation of law to serve only in the Eastern District on November 27, 1940. He served as Chief Judge from 1949 to 1961. He assumed senior status on March 15, 1961. His service terminated on May 29, 1967, due to his death.

References

Sources
 

1886 births
1967 deaths
People from Jasper, Tennessee
Cumberland University alumni
Tennessee state court judges
Judges of the United States District Court for the Middle District of Tennessee
Judges of the United States District Court for the Eastern District of Tennessee
United States district court judges appointed by Franklin D. Roosevelt
20th-century American judges